Cologne was a pigeon who received the Dickin Medal in 1947 from the People's Dispensary for Sick Animals for bravery in service during the Second World War.

Cologne served with the National Pigeon Service as Pigeon NURP 39.NPS 144 and carried out over 100 missions with Bomber Command and had previously homed successfully from several downed aircraft before the incident which earned the Dickin Medal.

His citation read –
“For homing from a crashed aircraft over Cologne although seriously wounded, whilst serving with the RAF in 1943”.

See also
 List of individual birds

References

External links
 PDSA Dickin Medal
 Picture of Pigeon Cologne

Recipients of the Dickin Medal
Individual domesticated pigeons